Green Mountain Reservoir lies at the northern end of Summit County, Colorado along the Blue River.  The Green Mountain Dam was built between 1938 and 1942 by the United States Bureau of Reclamation.  The reservoir and its dam store water to benefit Colorado's Western Slope. Created by President Roosevelt as part of the Colorado-Big Thompson Project in 1937, Green Mountain was the first facility to be constructed. This is because it represents a great compromise that made the C-BT project possible: it compensates the Western Slope for water diverted to cities in Northern Colorado from Lake Granby further upstream on the Colorado River. Water from Green Mountain Dam is released either over the spillway, through the dam, or through the hydroelectric powerplant at the dam's base. The Green Mountain Power Plant has the capacity to generate up to 21,000 kilowatts, using two generators. Combined with the other five Federal power plants on the C-BT, enough electricity is produced annually to power almost 60,000 American homes.

At maximum capacity, the elevation of the lake is 7,950 feet, and the dam is 309 feet high.

The lake is popular with anglers, who catch rainbow trout, lake trout, brown trout, and kokanee. 
State Highway 9 follows the east side of the lake.  The town of Heeney lies on the western side, and the Green Mountain Reservoir Trail goes past the  western side of the reservoir.

See also
List of largest reservoirs of Colorado

References

Reservoirs in Colorado
Protected areas of Summit County, Colorado
White River National Forest
Lakes of Summit County, Colorado
1942 establishments in Colorado